The Broadback River (In Cree: Chistamiskau Sipi) is a river in northern Quebec, Canada. It drains into Rupert Bay (a smaller bay at the south end of James Bay), just south of the Rupert River and Cree community Waskaganish. The major lake on the river's course is Lake Evans.

The river is a popular canoe-tripping destination.

Geography
The hydrographic basins adjacent to the Broadback River are:
north side: Rupert River, Nemiscau Lake, Nemiscau River;
east side: Frotet Lake, Troilus Lake, La Marte River;
south side: Nottaway River;
west side: Nottaway River, Rupert Bay.

From the mouth of Frotet Lake (located north of the lake), this river winds the Jamésie on 451 kilometers to finally reach the Rupert Bay close to the mouth of the Nottaway River.

In its course, the river crosses several lakes, including: Troilus Lake, Quenonisca Lake, Evans Lake (the largest) and Giffard Lake. It flows between the Rupert River rivers to the north and the Nottaway River to the south.

History
The Broadback, together with the Nottaway and Rupert rivers, was initially considered to be dammed and diverted as part of the James Bay Project. However, in 1972 hydro-electric development began on the more northerly La Grande and Eastmain Rivers, and the NBR Project was shelved. With the decision to divert the Rupert River to the La Grande, it is not likely that the Broadback will be developed in the foreseeable future.

Tributaries

Since the Broadback River flows relatively close to the northern edge of its basin, most of its major tributaries are left tributaries. Major tributaries in downstream order include:

Tributaries above Lake Evans:
Châtillon River
Assinica River
Coigne River (right tributary)
Nipukatasi River
Salamandre River

Tributaries below Lake Evans:
Ouasouagami River
Colomb River
Kaminahikuschit River
Natouacamisie River
Machisipi River
Lepallier River

See also 
Waskaganish (Cree village municipality)
Eeyou Istchee James Bay Regional Government

References

External links

Rivers of Nord-du-Québec
Tributaries of James Bay
Eeyou Istchee James Bay